Kristopher Bowers (born 1989) is an American composer and pianist. He has composed scores for films, video games, television and documentaries including Bridgerton, Green Book, Madden NFL, Dear White People, and Kobe Bryant's Muse. He has recorded, performed, and collaborated with Jay-Z, Kanye West, and José James. He won the Thelonious Monk International Jazz Piano Competition in 2011 and a Daytime Emmy Award for Outstanding Music Direction and Composition in 2017 for The Snowy Day. He has also composed the score for Ava DuVernay's Netflix mini-series When They See Us.

Life and career 
Bowers was born in Los Angeles, California, in 1989. His father is a film and television writer, and his mother is an executive at DirecTV. Although neither of his parents received more than a high school education, they wanted their son to play the piano, so they played recordings of pianists while he was still in the womb. They sent him to lessons beginning at the age of 4. He had private classical music lessons starting at around the age of 9. He listened to "classic soul records and hip-hop before falling under the spell of jazz, classical music, and film scores." Bowers studied jazz and classical piano at Los Angeles County High School for the Arts where his teachers included Mulgrew Miller and Donald Vega. He studied jazz at Colburn School for Performing Arts. He graduated in 2006 then attended Juilliard and obtained a bachelor's and master's degree in jazz performance. While a student, he performed frequently in New York City.

In the same year, Bowers played on Watch the Throne, a Jay Z and Kanye West album. He then toured with Marcus Miller during 2012. He has collaborated with musicians in several genres.

In late 2013, he recorded his debut album Heroes + Misfits (Concord, 2014). An AllMusic reviewer commented that the pianist was "based in jazz but with an ear for contemporary R&B, film scores, and electronic music". The album premiered at No. 1 on the iTunes Jazz charts.

In 2014, Bowers performed at the International Jazz Day Concert in Japan, the Festival de Jazz de Vitoria-Gasteiz in Spain, and at the London Jazz Festival. In 2016, Bowers was invited to perform at The White House for the International Jazz Day Concert hosted by President Barack and First Lady Michelle Obama.

In 2020 Bowers and Ben Proudfoot codirected the short documentary film A Concerto Is a Conversation, centering on Bowers's conversations with his grandfather about personal and family history. The film, which premiered at the 2021 Sundance Film Festival, was an Academy Award nominee for Best Documentary (Short Subject) at the 93rd Academy Awards.

In May 2022, the Monterey Jazz Festival commissioned Bowers to compose a work, which he presented that September at the annual event. The piece, Ásylo (Greek for "sanctuary"), commemorates the 30th anniversary of the nearby Monterey National Marine Sanctuary. Bowers had previously performed at the festival as a high school student for three years starting in 2003.

Film scoring 
His first film composition was for the 2013 documentary Elaine Stritch: Shoot Me. Two years later Bowers' work on the 2015 Showtime documentary Kobe Bryant's Muse gained him attention as an up-and-coming composer well-versed in a wide range of compositional styles. In the same year, he scored two other Showtime documentaries: I Am Giant about the football player Victor Cruz and Play It Forward about Tony Gonzalez. He was one of six composers invited to the Sundance Composers Lab in 2015.

Bowers also worked on the documentary Norman Lear: Just Another Version of You and the film Little Boxes, as well as the television programs Religion of Sports and Dear White People. Also in 2016, Bowers composed music for the Amazon children's Christmas special, The Snowy Day, based on the 1962 book of the same title by Ezra Jack Keats. It was for this show that Bowers received a Daytime Emmy in 2017.

During the same period, basketball player Kobe Bryant approached Bowers about composing music for his post-basketball transition into film and television production. When asked about the choice to create an original piece of music for an advertisement, Bryant said, "I thought it was very important for the brand to have an anthem... that's a Bodyarmor 'Obsession is Natural' track."

Bowers wrote the score for the 2018 film Green Book. He was also the piano teacher for the film's star, Mahershala Ali, and was Ali's stand in for some close ups of hands playing.

Bowers wrote the score for Ava DuVernay's  2019 mini-series When They See Us. He said that he took on the project after watching the first episode: "It was so heartbreaking and difficult to watch and gut-wrenching" with an urgent story to tell.

Bowers composed the score for Netflix's period drama, Bridgerton, telling Headliner Magazine: "I think that it's really easy to make a love story cheesy; to make a love story that really feels like it's saying something a little different is a challenge, and I felt like this was doing that." He also shared that despite the huge-sounding orchestral recording, it was all done remotely during lockdown: "We did it all remotely, so when you're hearing this huge orchestral sound, it's really just eight musicians that are at home recording themselves and layering themselves over and over again!"

Bowers wrote the score of the 2021 film Space Jam: A New Legacy. and the 2022 film Chevalier.

Collaborating and performing 
In 2015, Bowers teamed up with the choreographer Kyle Abraham, to create Absent Matter, which premiered at the Joyce Theater in New York City. During the following year, Bowers and Abraham collaborated again on Untitled America for Alvin Ailey.

Bowers performed at the White House for the 2016 International Jazz Day, hosted by President of the United States Barack Obama and First Lady Michelle Obama. Bowers participated as a composer in the Sundance Film Composers Lab at Skywalker Sound in 2015.

Bowers has paired his music with extensive and immersive dining experiences. In 2016, he was hired by Bang & Olufsen to create a score to accompany a multi-course meal prepared by chef Fredrik Berselius. In 2017, Krug commissioned Bowers to write compositions inspired by and paired with a signature Krug champagne.

Artistry
In a review of one of his early shows as a bandleader, The New York Times referred to Bowers' playing as "serious, thoughtful, organized, restrained; he made the piano sound good. His set had range and ambition and said something strong, sweet, and normative about phrasing and rhythm in jazz right now."

Bowers' influences include "Oscar Peterson, Wynton Kelly ('for his comping and incredible feel'), Duke Ellington ('for his compositions'), Ahmad Jamal and Count Basie", as well as John Williams.

Awards and honors
 Winner, - Thelonious Monk International Jazz Piano Competition, 2011
Honor - DownBeat magazine: “25 for the Future”, 2016
Winner - Daytime Emmy Award for Outstanding Music Direction and Composition, The Snowy Day, 2017
Nominated - 2019 Critics' Choice Movie Awards for 'Best Score', Green Book, 2018.
Honor - ROBIE Pioneer Award from the Jackie Robinson Foundation, 2019.
Nominated -  Academy Award for Best Documentary Short Subject, A Concerto Is a Conversation (co-director), 2021

Discography
An asterisk (*) indicates that the year is that of release.

As leader/co-leader

As sideman

Works

Films

Television

Documentaries

Video games

References

External links

"Piano Jazz with John Weber". NPR 2012 interview and solo and duo piano performances.
"Composer Kris Bowers Unpacks the Idea of ‘Black Excellence’: ‘It Exists in the Small Moments of Every Day’". Variety Artisans column 
"How ‘Bridgerton’ Composer Kris Bowers Set Up a 'Dangerous Connection' in Season 2". Hollywood Reporter podcast

1989 births
20th-century African-American people
21st-century African-American musicians
21st-century American composers
21st-century American male musicians
21st-century American pianists
21st-century jazz composers
African-American electronic musicians
African-American film score composers
African-American jazz composers
African-American jazz musicians
African-American jazz pianists
African-American record producers
Ambient composers
American jazz composers
American male film score composers
American film score composers
American male jazz composers
American male jazz musicians
American male jazz pianists
American television composers
Electronic composers
Living people
Male television composers
Record producers from Los Angeles
Video game composers